The 2021 Indiana Hoosiers football team represented Indiana University in the 2021 NCAA Division I FBS football season. The Hoosiers played their home games at Memorial Stadium in Bloomington, Indiana and competed as a member of the East Division of the Big Ten Conference. The team was led by fifth-year head coach Tom Allen.

Indiana finished the season with a 2–10 record, which would be their worst season since 2011, when they finished 1–11.

Spring Game
The 2021 Spring Game was held in Bloomington, Indiana on April 10; however, it was a closed-practice, with the general public not in attendance.

Previous season

The Hoosiers finished the 2020 season 6–1 in Big Ten play to finish in second place in the Eastern Division. This would be the Hoosiers' best finish to a season since the 1967 season. The Hoosiers were invited to the Outback Bowl, where they would lose by six points to Ole Miss, 26–20.

Following an initial cancelation of the football season by the Big Ten on August 11, 2020, the Big Ten would reverse their decision on September 16. The truncated season was due to ongoing issues related to the COVID-19 pandemic.

The COVID-19 pandemic was particularly impactful on the Hoosiers late in the season, when on December 9, Purdue and Indiana announced a mutual one-time cancellation of the Old Oaken Bucket rivalry game (originally scheduled for December 12). Team-related activities were paused because of an elevated number of coronavirus cases within both the Boilermakers' and Hoosiers' programs. On December 13, Purdue and Indiana came to a mutual agreement to reschedule the Old Oaken Bucket game for one week later, on December 18; however, on December 15, both teams again mutually agreed to cancel the Friday contest, due to issues remaining on both teams with COVID complications.

Offseason

Coaching changes
On December 12, 2020, the South Alabama Jaguars announced that they had hired Indiana defensive coordinator Kane Wommack as their new head coach; Wommack had previously served three years for the Hoosiers in a defensive coaching capacity, first as its linebackers coach in 2018 and then as its defensive coordinator for 2019 and 2020. On January 17, 2021, Indiana announced that they had hired Georgia Bulldogs defensive backs coach Charlton Warren as the Hoosiers' new defensive coordinator; Warren had served as the defensive back coach for Georgia for two years (2019-2020).

On January 13, 2021, the Michigan Wolverines announced that they had hired Indiana running backs' coach Mike Hart as their new running backs' coach; Hart had served four years as the Hoosiers' running backs coach (2017-2020) and also split time as the Assistant Head Coach. On February 8, 2021, Indiana announced that they had hired Kansas City Chiefs running backs' coach Deland McCullough as the Hoosiers' new running backs coach; McCullough had previously served as the Hoosiers' running backs' coach from 2011 to 2016.

Transfers

Outgoing

Notable departures from the 2020 squad included:

Incoming

2021 NFL draft

Hoosiers who were picked in the 2021 NFL Draft:

Preseason

Position key

Recruits
The Hoosiers signed a total of 14 recruits.

Preseason Big Ten poll
Although the Big Ten Conference has not held an official preseason poll since 2010, Cleveland.com has polled sports journalists representing all member schools as a de facto preseason media poll since 2011. For the 2021 poll, Indiana was projected to finish third in the East Division.

Schedule
The Hoosiers' 2021 schedule consisted of six home games and six away games. The Hoosiers played three non-conference games, against Idaho and Cincinnati at home and on the road against Western Kentucky. In conference, Indiana hosted Rutgers, Ohio State, Michigan State, and Minnesota. They traveled to Iowa, Maryland, Michigan, Penn State, and Purdue.

Sources:

Personnel

Roster

Rankings

Game summaries

at No. 18 Iowa

vs Idaho

vs No. 8 Cincinnati

at Western Kentucky

at No. 4 Penn State

vs No. 10 Michigan State

vs No. 5 Ohio State

at Maryland

at No. 7 Michigan

vs Rutgers

vs Minnesota

at Purdue

Awards and honors

Award watch lists
Listed in the order that they were released

Radio
Radio coverage for all games will be broadcast on IUHoosiers.com All-Access and on various radio frequencies throughout the state. The primary radio announcer is long-time broadcaster Don Fischer with Play-by-Play.

References

Indiana
Indiana Hoosiers football seasons
Indiana Hoosiers football